Juan José Angosto Hernández (born 19 August 1985), known as Juanjo, is a Spanish professional futsal player who plays as a goalkeeper for ElPozo Murcia and the Spain national team.

Club career
He started his professional career at Intec Murcia and then joined ElPozo Murcia.

Honours

Club
ElPozo Murcia
 Primera División: 2005–06, 2006–07, 2008–09, 2009–10
 Copa de España: 2008, 2010
 Supercopa de España: 2006, 2009
 European Cup Winners Cup: 2003–04
 Copa Ibérica: 2006

Inter Movistar
 Supercopa de España: 2011
 Intercontinental Futsal Cup: 2011

Benfica
 Liga Portuguesa: 2014–15
 Taça de Portugal: 2014–15
 Supertaça de Portugal: 2015

Barcelona
UEFA Futsal Champions League third place: 2018–19

International
Spain
 UEFA Futsal Championship: 2007, 2010, 2012, 2016
 FIFA Futsal World Cup: Runner-up 2008

Individual
 LNFS Best Goalkeeper: 2005–06, 2008–09, 2009–10

References

External links
 Benfica official profile 
 

1985 births
Living people
Sportspeople from Murcia
Spanish men's futsal players
Futsal goalkeepers
ElPozo Murcia FS players
Inter FS players
S.L. Benfica futsal players
FC Barcelona Futsal players
Spanish expatriate sportspeople in Portugal